The large bamboo rat, Sumatran rat, or Indomalayan rat (Rhizomys sumatrensis) is a species of rodent in the family Spalacidae found in Cambodia, China, Indonesia, Laos, Malaysia, Myanmar, Thailand, and Vietnam. It is one of four species of bamboo rat.

Their typical diet includes bamboo roots, but they  also feed on cultivated tapioca and sugarcane. They are, in turn, hunted as food by human beings.

The species is a natural host for the disease-causing mold, Penicillium marneffei.

It is one of several species of large rats that have been identified by scholars of Sherlockiana as the original model for the mysterious  Giant Rat of Sumatra alluded to in a fictional story by Sir Arthur Conan Doyle.

References

Rhizomys
Rats of Asia
Rodents of Cambodia
Rodents of China
Rodents of Indonesia
Rodents of Laos
Rodents of Malaysia
Rodents of Myanmar
Rodents of Thailand
Rodents of Vietnam
Mammals described in 1821
Taxonomy articles created by Polbot